Moanin' Low is a popular torch song. The music was written by Ralph Rainger; the lyrics by Howard Dietz. The song was published in 1929 and was introduced that same year in the musical revue The Little Show by Libby Holman becoming a hit and Holman's signature song. A recording by The Charleston Chasers (vocal by Eva Taylor) was also popular in 1929.

Since its publication, the song has become a popular jazz standard.

Selected recordings

 Annette Hanshaw - recorded on August 29, 1929 for Okeh Records (catalog No. 41292).
 Billie Holiday recorded her version of the song on March 31, 1937 with Teddy Wilson and His Orchestra for Brunswick Records (catalog No. 7877).
 Lena Horne - recorded on December 17, 1941 for Victor Records (catalog No. 27817A).
 Harry James recorded a version in 1951 (released in 1952) on Columbia 39678.
 Ella Fitzgerald - recorded on December 31, 1953 for Decca Records (catalog No 29475).
 Dinah Shore - included in the album Bouquet of Blues (1956).
 Johnny Mathis - for his album The Rhythms and Ballads of Broadway (1960)
 Barbra Streisand recorded her version of the song in 1975 in her album Lazy Afternoon, arranged and conducted by Rupert Holmes.

Film appearances
In the Humphrey Bogart-Lauren Bacall film, Key Largo, Claire Trevor gave a memorable rendition of the song in a role that won her the 1948 Academy Award for Best Supporting Actress.
Annette Hanshaw's 1929 version was used in the animated film Sita Sings the Blues.
In the 1950 Kirk Douglas-Lauren Bacall film, Young Man With A Horn, it appears repeatedly in instrumental form.

See also
 List of 1920s jazz standards

References 

1929 songs
1920s jazz standards
Billie Holiday songs
Songs with lyrics by Howard Dietz
Songs with music by Ralph Rainger
Torch songs